Michael ("Mike") William Shields is a British computer scientist.

Overview
Mike Shields has been an academic in the Department of Computing at the University of Surrey in Guildford, southern England. His research contributions have been in theoretical computer science, especially concerning concurrency. In particular, he has written books on automata theory and the semantics of parallel computing.

A meeting was held in 2006 at the British Computer Society's offices in London to celebrate Shields' contribution to computer science (his "innovative and elegant foundational work on models of concurrency") on his retirement. He has since moved to Malta.

F. X. Reid
F. X. Reid (aka FXR) is a pen name that Shields has sometimes used in his more humorous writings and even within his serious work.

Reid has been a long-time contributor to the British Computer Society's FACS Specialist Group FACS FACTS newsletter in the past. For example, he has been an enthusiast for the COMEFROM statement and an expert on its semantics. Apparently reports of FXR's death in 2006 were untrue, and his musings continued after this time in the newsletter.

F. X. Reid's most widely known work is "The Song of Hakawatha," a parody of Henry Wadsworth Longfellow's poem The Song of Hiawatha containing references to hacking, Unix and compilers. F. X. Reid has also been mentioned in computer science books.

Reid has been quoted as saying In program proving, only the presence of bugs in one's proof is ascertainable, not their absence, similar to but not the same as a well-known quotation by E. W. Dijkstra about software testing.

Books
Michael W. Shields has published a number of books including:

References

External links
 
 
 

Year of birth missing (living people)
Living people
Academics of the University of Surrey
English computer scientists
Theoretical computer scientists
Formal methods people